Miloševo (meaning "belonging to Miloš") may refer to:

Miloševo, Jagodina, a village in the city of Jagodina, Serbia
, a village in the municipality of Obilić, Kosovo
Miloševo, Negotin, a village in the municipality of  Negotin, Serbia
Miloševo, Čelinac, a village in the municipality of  Čelinac, Bosnia and Herzegovina
Miloševo, Kruševo, a village in the municipality of  Kruševo, Republic of Macedonia

or:
Miloševo Brdo, a village in the municipality of  Gradiška, Bosnia and Herzegovina
Novo Miloševo, a village in the municipality of  Novi Bečej, Serbia

See also 
 Milošević, a surname
 Miloševići (disambiguation)
 Mileševo (disambiguation)
 Maleševo (disambiguation)
 Mališevo, a settlement